The Lapiang Bagong Lakas ng Nueva Ecija (New Power of Nueva Ecija Party; BALANE) is a Nueva Ecija regional political party in the Philippines, which was formerly affiliated with the Nationalist People's Coalition (NPC), then the Kabalikat ng Malayang Pilipino (KAMPI) and finally back to NPC when KAMPI merged with Lakas–CMD to become Lakas Kampi CMD and the rival party Unang Sigaw became its local affiliate.

There are no results available of the last elections for the House of Representatives, but according to the website of the House, the party holds 1 out of 235 seats (state of the parties, June 2005).

Notable party members
 Eduardo Rey Gil Joson - Former 1st District Board Member of Sangguniang Panlalawigan ng Nueva Ecija
 Romanito del Rosario Juatco - Former 4th District Board Member of Sangguniang Panlalawigan ng Nueva Ecija
 Rommel Padilla - Former 1st District Board Member of Sangguniang Panlalawigan ng Nueva Ecija

Conservative parties in the Philippines
Local political parties in the Philippines
Politics of Nueva Ecija
Regionalist parties
Regionalist parties in the Philippines
Social conservative parties